Bharatiya Lok Kala Mandal is a cultural institution based in Udaipur in Rajasthan state in India engaged in studying folk art, culture, songs and festivals of Rajasthan, Gujarat and Madhya Pradesh and to popularise and propagate folk arts, folk dances and folk literature. It was founded by Padam Shri Late Devi Lal Samar in the year 1952. The institution has a museum that exhibits  collection of folk articles from Rajasthan like rural-dresses, ornaments, puppets, masks, dolls, folk musical instruments, folk deities and paintings. There is puppet theater (Kathputli) too where puppet shows are held at regular intervals.

Museum 
It includes a museum dedicated to folk art of Rajasthan.

 Wall sculptures

 Other items

References
Devi Lal Samar the Visionary Behind The Bharatiya Lok Kala Mandal
BLKM
Udaipur

Museums in Rajasthan
Cultural organisations based in India
Museums established in 1952
Folk art museums and galleries
Organisations based in Udaipur
Puppet theaters
Puppet museums
Tourist attractions in Udaipur
Rajasthani folklore
Puppetry in India
1952 establishments in Rajasthan
Buildings and structures in Udaipur
Museums in Udaipur
Culture of Udaipur